HSO may refer to:

Orchestras 
 Harrisburg Symphony Orchestra, in Harrisburg, Pennsylvania, United States
 Hartford Symphony Orchestra in Hartford, Connecticut, United States
 Helena Symphony Orchestra, in Helena, Montana, United States
 Hereford String Orchestra, in Hereford, England
 Hillsboro Symphony Orchestra, in Hillsboro, Oregon, United States
 Hollywood Symphony Orchestra, in Los Angeles, California, United States
 Houston Symphony, in Houston, Texas, United States
 Huntsville Symphony Orchestra, in Huntsville, Alabama, United States

Other uses 
 Ford HSO engine
 Hamburg State Opera
 Health Sciences Online
 Healthscope, an Australian hospital operator
 Herschel Space Observatory
 Hungarian Space Office